An SDP40 is a 6-axle passenger diesel-electric locomotive built by General Motors Electro-Motive Division (EMD) between June 1966 and May 1970.

Design
Like its predecessor in EMD's catalog, the SDP35, the SDP40 is a high-horsepower freight locomotive with equipment for passenger train service.

In 1966, EMD replaced all their production units with those powered by the new 645 diesel. They included six-axle models SD38, SD40 and SD45, in addition to SDP40. All had standard components including the frame, cab, generator, trucks, traction motors, and air brakes. The main difference was the power: the SD38 produced  from a non-turbocharged V16, the SD40 produced  from a turbocharged V16, and the SD45 produced  from a turbocharged V20.

The SD40 and SDP40 were so similar that EMD published common operator's and service manuals to cover both.

At the time most passenger locomotives needed to provide steam to the passenger cars for heating, cooking, and sometimes cooling. They needed a higher gear ratio for faster running, the graduated-release feature on the air brakes, and type F tightlock couplers to keep equipment together in the event of a derailment.

Appearance
Earlier passenger diesels, like EMD E8, ALCO PA, FM Erie-built and Baldwin Sharknose locomotives, were streamlined cab units designed for visual appeal and the appearance of speed. The SDP40 and the SDP35 & SDP45 instead have the same appearance as their freight counterparts. This look was contemporary to, and eventually overtaken by cowl units like the GE U30CG and EMD FP45, SDP40F and F40PH.

Visually, the locomotive is a hood unit distinguished only by the shape of its rear end behind the radiators, with its flat end having no number boards, shuttered boiler air intake on each side, extra exhaust stacks over the boiler, cantilevered walkway around the flat end, and very steep rear steps. EMD applied this same end to the passenger SDP35, SDP45, and GP40P locomotives, as well as the freight DD35, DDA40X and SD40T-2.

Amtrak's SDP40F locomotive, although sharing several mechanical specifications, is visually a much different locomotive. Seven years separate their introductions, and the SDP40F was actually based on the SD40-2. It had a full-width carbody, similar to the FP45. It was also  longer than the SDP40.

Original Owners
Great Northern Railway (GN) purchased the first six SDP40s in 1966, to replace older E-units on their Western Star and smaller regional trains. These were followed in 1967 by eight more powerful SDP45 locomotives ordered for the Empire Builder. After the startup of Amtrak in 1971, Great Northern's successor Burlington Northern Railroad (BN) converted the locomotives to freight service.

One SDP40, former GN 323, was temporarily renumbered BN 1976 and painted in red, white and blue for the United States Bicentennial in 1976.

NdeM had ten units delivered in 1968 and another four in 1970. In 1998, the government of Mexico privatized the NdeM the locomotives were split between two successor companies. Eight went to TFM, which was later purchased by Kansas City Southern Railway and became KCSM. Of those eight, two were rebuilt to SD22ECOs, and the other six were scrapped. The remaining six went to Ferromex. Of those six, four were rebuilt to SDP40-2s and remain in service, the other two were scrapped.

Roster

Wrecks 
On August 23, 1979, BN 6399 was the lead unit of train 23 when it ran head-on into train 182 at Maiden Rock, WI. 6399 was repaired and returned to service, where it remained until its retirement, and it was eventually donated to the Minnesota Transportation Museum, where it still operates today. The four units of the other train were also repaired. The three trailing GP40 units were destroyed.

Preservation 

BNSF Railway donated #6327 - former Great Northern #325 and their last SDP40 in service - to the Minnesota Transportation Museum in May 2009. Since then, it has been in service on the Osceola and St. Croix Valley Railway. The Museum has plans to repaint the locomotive into the Great Northern's  simplified orange and green color paint scheme.

See also 
GP40P
List of GM-EMD locomotives
List of GMD Locomotives

References

Sources 

 
 
 Shine, Joseph W. (1992). Great Northern Color Pictorial - Volume 2: Division Assignment, Second Generation Diesels, The Big Sky Blue Era. La Mirada, CA: Four Ways West Publications. 
 Strauss, John F. Jr. (1998). Great Northern Color Pictorial - Volume 5: Rocky's Robe of Many Colors. La Mirada, CA: Four Ways West Publications. 
 The UNofficial EMD Homepage. Retrieved on May 1, 2009
 Sarberenyi, Robert. EMD's SD40, SD40A, and SDP40 - Original Owners. Retrieved on May 5, 2009
 Great Northern Empire - GN EMP SDP40 Roster. Retrieved on May 5, 2009
 KCS NAFTA Rosters. Retrieved on May 5, 2009
 Service Department (1966). SD40 - SDP40 Operator's Manual. La Grange, IL: Electro-Motive Division of General Motors Corporation
 
 
 EMD SD 6 WHEEL TRUCKS-DATA. Retrieved on July 25, 2010

SD40P
C-C locomotives
Passenger locomotives
Diesel-electric locomotives of the United States
Railway locomotives introduced in 1966
Standard gauge locomotives of the United States
Standard gauge locomotives of Mexico
Diesel-electric locomotives of Mexico